The Dominican Republic competed at the 2020 Summer Olympics in Tokyo. Originally scheduled to take place from 24 July to 9 August 2020, the Games were postponed to 23 July to 8 August 2021, because of the COVID-19 pandemic. It was the nation's fifteenth consecutive appearance at the Summer Olympics. The Dominican Republic left the Summer Olympics with 3 silver medals and 2 bronze medals with moderate success, but not able to secure a single gold medal in any of the events.

Medalists

Competitors
The following is the list of number of competitors participating in the Games:

Athletics

Athletes from the Dominican Republic achieved entry standards, either by qualifying time or by world ranking, in the following track and field events (up to a maximum of 3 athletes in each event):

Track & road events

Field events

Baseball

The Dominican Republic national baseball team qualified for the Olympics by winning the gold medal at the 2021 Baseball Final Olympic Qualifying Tournament in Mexico and securing an outright berth, marking the country's Olympic debut in baseball.

Summary

Team roster

Group play

Round 1

Round 1 repechage

Round 2 repechage

Bronze medal game

Boxing

Dominican Republic entered seven boxers (five men and two women) to compete in each of the following weight classes into the Olympic tournament. With the cancellation of the 2021 Pan American Qualification Tournament in Buenos Aires, all of them, led by Rio 2016 Olympian Leonel de los Santos (men's lightweight), finished among the top five of their respective weight divisions to secure their places on the Dominican Republic squad based on the IOC's Boxing Task Force Rankings for the Americas.

Diving

Dominican Republic entered one diver into the Olympic competition for the first time since Los Angeles 1984, by attaining a top 18 finish and securing the last of seven available berths in the men's springboard at the 2021 FINA Diving World Cup in Tokyo, Japan.

Equestrian

Dominican Republic entered one equestrian rider into the Olympic competition by finishing among the top fifteen and securing the last of four available slots in the individual jumping at the 2019 Pan American Games in Lima, Peru. MeanwhIle, one dressage rider was added to the Dominican Republic roster by finishing in the top four, outside the group selection, of the individual FEI Olympic Rankings for Groups D and E (North, Central, and South America).

Dressage

Qualification Legend: Q = Qualified for the final; q = Qualified for the final as a lucky loser

Jumping

Judo

Dominican Republic qualified one judoka for the men's middleweight category (90 kg) at the Games. Robert Florentino accepted a continental berth from the Americas as the nation's top-ranked judoka outside of direct qualifying position in the IJF World Ranking List of June 28, 2021.

Rowing

Dominican Republic qualified one boat in the men's single sculls for the Games by finishing fifth in the B-final and securing the last of five berths available at the 2021 FISA Americas Olympic Qualification Regatta in Rio de Janeiro, Brazil, marking the country's debut in the sport.

Qualification Legend: FA=Final A (medal); FB=Final B (non-medal); FC=Final C (non-medal); FD=Final D (non-medal); FE=Final E (non-medal); FF=Final F (non-medal); SA/B=Semifinals A/B; SC/D=Semifinals C/D; SE/F=Semifinals E/F; QF=Quarterfinals; R=Repechage

Swimming

Dominican Republic received a universality invitation from FINA to send two top-ranked swimmers (one per gender) in their respective individual events to the Olympics, based on the FINA Points System of June 28, 2021.

Taekwondo

Dominican Republic entered three athletes into the taekwondo competition at the Games. 2019 Pan American Games silver medalist Bernardo Pié (men's 68 kg), along with Rio 2016 Olympians Moisés Hernández (men's 80 kg) and Katherine Rodríguez (women's +67 kg), secured the spots on the Dominican Republic squad with a top two finish each in their respective weight classes at the 2020 Pan American Qualification Tournament in San José, Costa Rica.

Volleyball

Indoor
Summary

Women's tournament

Dominican Republic women's volleyball team qualified for the Olympics by winning the pool round and securing an outright berth at the North American Olympic Qualification Tournament in Santo Domingo, marking the country's recurrence to the sport after an eight-year absence.

Team roster

Group play

Quarterfinal

Weightlifting

Dominican Republic entered five weightlifters (two men and three women) into the Olympic competition. Two-time Olympian Beatriz Pirón (women's 49 kg), Crismery Santana (women's 87 kg), and Verónica Saladín (women's 87 kg) secured one of the top eight slots each in their respective weight divisions based on the IWF Absolute World Ranking. Meanwhile, Rio 2016 Olympian Luis García and rookie Zacarías Bonnat topped the field of weightlifters vying for qualification from the Americas in the men's 61 and 81 kg category, respectively, based on the IWF Absolute Continental Rankings.

See also
Dominican Republic at the 2019 Pan American Games

References

Nations at the 2020 Summer Olympics
2020
2021 in Dominican Republic sport